Ninth Grade Success Academy may refer to a Ninth Grade Success Academy at:
 Waianae High School#Academics, in Hawai'i
 West Philadelphia High School#Small learning communities, in Pennsylvania

9th Grade Success Academy 
 Northeast High School (Philadelphia)#Programs

See also 
 Success Academy (disambiguation)